Nuri Killigil, also known as Nuri Pasha (1889–1949) was an Ottoman general in the Ottoman Army. He was the half-brother of Ottoman Minister of War, Enver Pasha.

Military career

Libya 

Infantry Machine-Gun Captain Nuri Efendi was sent to Libya on a Greek ship with Major Jafar al-Askari Bey and 10,000 gold. His mission was to organize and coordinate operations of Teşkilat-ı Mahsusa forces with local forces against Italian and British forces. They landed on the shore between Tobruk and Sallum on February 21, 1915, and then  went to Ahmed Sharif es Senussi in Sallum. In 1917, in an attempt to organize the efforts which was dispersed by the British, the Ottoman General Staff established the "Africa Groups Command" (Afrika Grupları Komutanlığı), of which the primary objective was the coastal regions of Libya. Lieutenant Colonel Nuri Bey was appointed its first commander and his chief of Staff was Staff Major Abdurrahman Nafiz Bey (Gürman).

Caucasus 

Nuri Bey's elder brother Enver Pasha, commander of the Ottoman Army, who saw an opportunity in the Caucasus after the Russian Revolution took Russia out of World War I, called back Nuri Bey from Libya. He was promoted to Mirliva Fahri (honorary) Ferik and gave the mission to form and command volunteer based the Islamic Army of the Caucasus. Nuri Bey came to Yelizavetpol (present day: Ganja) on May 25, 1918, and began to organize his forces. The Army of Islam was formed officially on July 10, 1918. Liberation of the Caucasus campaign begun and fierce fightings  happened between Bolshevik Baku Commune-Armenians Dashnaktsutyun and Islamic Army of the Caucasus. The Islamic Army of the Caucasus lead by Nuri Pasha took control of the whole Azerbaijan and the capital Baku on 15 September 1918.

At the end of the war, Nuri was arrested by British troops and held in detention in Batum, awaiting trial for wartime crimes. In August 1919, his supporters ambushed guards escorting him and helped him escape to Erzurum.

Later life 
In 1938, Killigil bought a coal mining plant in Turkey. He began to organize the production of guns, bullets, gas masks, and other war equipment. After some time, he announced the end of the production of weapons, but still secretly continued production.
 
Killigil established contact with Franz von Papen, the Nazi ambassador in Ankara in 1941 in order to win German support for the Pan-Turkic cause. With his assistance, the Turkestan Legion was formed by the Schutzstaffel. During World War II, Killigil was in Germany attempting to achieve the recognition of the independence of Azerbaijan. The attempts were unsuccessful.

Death 
He was killed on 2 March 1949 by an explosion in his factory that also killed 28 other people. He was buried without a proper funeral ceremony at the time, as it was viewed as contrary to religious beliefs for dismembered corpses. A formal funeral service, to which the Azerbaijani politician Ganire Paşayeva and representatives from the Municipality of Istanbul attended was only held in 2016.

Sources 

1889 births
1949 deaths
People from Bitola
Ottoman Military Academy alumni
Ottoman military personnel of World War I
Ottoman Army generals
Armenian genocide perpetrators
Turkish collaborators with Nazi Germany
Enver Pasha
20th-century Turkish businesspeople
Industrial accident deaths
Pan-Turkists
Turkish anti-communists
Accidental deaths in Turkey